
This is a list of women's football clubs in Sweden. For men's football clubs, see the list of football clubs in Sweden.

By league 

 Damallsvenskan
 Elitettan

Alphabetically

A 

 AIK
 Alviks IK

B 
 Bälinge IF
 Bollstanäs SK

C

D 

 Dalsjöfors GoIF
 Djurgårdens IF Dam

E 

 Eskilstuna United DFF
Essinge IK

F 

 Falköpings Kvinnliga IK
 Falu BS
 FOC Farsta

G 

 Gideonsbergs IF

H 

 Hammarby IF
 Holmalunds IF
 Husie IF

I

J 

 Jitex BK

K 

 IFK Kalmar
 Kopparbergs/Göteborg FC
 Kristianstads DFF

L 

 Linköpings FC

M 

 Mallbackens IF

N 

 IF Norvalla

O 
 KIF Örebro
 Ornäs BK
 Östers IF
 Östervåla IF

P

Q 

 QBIK

R 
 FC Rosengård

S 

 Sils IF
 Själevads IK
 Staffanstorps GIF
 Stattena IF
 Sundsvalls DFF
 Sunnanå SK

T 
 Tyresö FF

U 

 Umeå IK
 Umeå Södra FF

V 

 Vasalund/Essinge IF

W

X

Y

Z 

 
Sweden women
clubs women
Football clubs, women's